Letha Wilson (born 1976, Honolulu) is an American artist working in photography and sculpture. She received her BFA from Syracuse University and her MFA from Hunter College. She currently lives in Brooklyn, NY. Her work has been exhibited at The Studio Museum in Harlem, Bronx Museum of the Arts, Bemis Center for Contemporary Art, International Center of Photography, and Hauser & Wirth, among others.

In 2013, Wilson was the recipient of a New York Foundation for the Arts Fellowship in Photography. Wilson was also awarded a Jerome Foundation Travel Grant in 2014. She has attended residencies at the Skowhegan School of Painting and Sculpture.  In July 2018, Wilson was recognized by Artsy through her inclusion on their list of 'These 20 Female Artists Are Pushing Sculpture Forward'.

Career 
Wilson often combines large-scale landscape photographs with sculptural elements of metal and concrete, challenging the two-dimensional nature of traditional photography. She is influenced by the landscape of the American West and by the land artists of the 1960s and 1970s, such as Michael Heizer. In the creation of her work, she often cuts or folds her photographic prints. She works with both darkroom and digital photography, as well as with C-prints and emulsion transfers.

Exhibitions 
2018 "Fold and Unfold: Kate Steciw and Letha Wilson", at MACRO, Museo d'Arte Contemporanea, Rome, Italy's
     "Horizon Eyes" at Grimm Gallery in New York City(March 18-April 22, 2018).
2017 "In The Abstract" at Massachusetts Museum of Contemporary Art (MASS MoCA), North Adams, MA and

Awards 
2013 New York Foundation for the Arts Fellowship

References 

1976 births
Living people
American women artists
Hunter College alumni
People from Brooklyn
People from Honolulu
Syracuse University alumni
21st-century American women
Skowhegan School of Painting and Sculpture alumni